The 1989 Santam Bank Trophy Division B was the fourth tier of domestic South African rugby, below the two Currie Cup divisions and Division A.

Teams

Changes between 1988 and 1989 seasons

 Division B was reduced from seven to six teams.
  were promoted from to Division A.

Changes between 1989 and 1990 seasons

 Divisions A and B merged into one nine-team division.

Competition

Regular season and title play-offs
There were six participating teams in the Santam Bank Trophy Division B. Teams played each other twice over the course of the season, once at home and once away. Teams received two points for a win and one points for a draw. The top two teams in the division – along with the top two teams from Division A qualified for the title play-off finals. The team that finished first in Division A would play at home against the team that finished second in Division B and the team that finished second in Division A would play at home against the team that finished first in Division B.

Promotion play-offs
The Division B champion qualified for the promotion play-offs. That team played off against the team placed bottom in Division A over two legs. The winner over these two ties qualified for the 1990 Santam Bank Trophy Division A, while the losing team qualified for the 1990 Santam Bank Trophy Division B.

Log

Fixtures and results

Round one

Round two

Round three

Round four

Round five

Round six

Round seven

Round eight

Round nine

Round ten

Round eleven

Round twelve

Santam Bank Trophy finals
The top two teams from Division A and the top two teams from Division B qualified to the trophy finals:

Semi-finals

Final

Promotion play-offs

See also
 1989 Currie Cup Division A
 1989 Currie Cup Division B
 1989 Santam Bank Trophy Division A
 1989 Lion Cup

References

1989B
1989 Currie Cup